Frank William Emmer (February 17, 1896 – October 18, 1963), born in Crestline, Ohio, was a shortstop for the Cincinnati Reds (1916 and 1926).

In 2 seasons he played in 122 Games and had 313 At Bats, 30 Runs, 57 Hits, 10 Doubles, 7 Triples, 20 RBI, 2 Stolen Bases, 20 Walks, .182 Batting Average, .234 On-base percentage, .259 Slugging Percentage, 81 Total Bases and 17 Sacrifice Hits.

He died in Homestead, Florida, at the age of 67.

Sources

1896 births
1963 deaths
Major League Baseball shortstops
Cincinnati Reds players
Baseball players from Ohio
People from Crestline, Ohio
People from Homestead, Florida
Portsmouth Cobblers players
Charleston Senators players
Chillicothe Babes players
Huntington Babes players
Maysville Angels players
Dayton Veterans players
Flint Vehicles players
Albany Senators players
Seattle Indians players
Minneapolis Millers (baseball) players
Nashville Vols players
Wilkes-Barre Barons (baseball) players
Harrisburg Senators players
Scranton Miners players
Sportspeople from Miami-Dade County, Florida